Danny Smith is an American producer, writer and voice actor on the American animated television series Family Guy. He has been with the show since its inception and throughout the years has contributed many episodes, such as "Holy Crap", "The Father, the Son, and the Holy Fonz", "Chitty Chitty Death Bang" and the Christmas themed episodes, "Road to the North Pole" and "A Very Special Family Guy Freakin' Christmas". Smith also voices the Evil Monkey and the Giant Chicken, otherwise known as Ernie. He is the only Family Guy writer who hails from the state of Rhode Island, where the show is set (although creator Seth MacFarlane attended the Rhode Island School of Design). Smith graduated from Smithfield High School (Rhode Island) in 1977 and from Rhode Island College in 1981.

An experienced sitcom writer, he has written for several television shows, such as Nurses, 3rd Rock from the Sun, Yes, Dear and Head of the Class.

Smith wrote and illustrated a regular feature in the Rhode Island College student newspaper, The Anchor, called, Joe Flynn and His Dog Spot, about a man and his best friend, a talking dog. One April Fool's self-parody of this feature was titled, Joe Flynn and His Dong Spots.

Smith succeeded former Today  host Matt Lauer as the host of the Providence edition of PM Magazine in the early 1980s. Smith is the brother of Steve Smith of Steve Smith and the Nakeds.

Episodes written 
List of Family Guy episodes Smith has written.
 #3: "Chitty Chitty Death Bang" (1999)
 #9: "Holy Crap" (1999)
 #44: "A Very Special Family Guy Freakin' Christmas" (2001)
 #61: "Peter's Got Woods" (2005)
 #68: "The Father, the Son, and the Holy Fonz" (2005)
 #90: "Peter's Two Dads" (2007)
 #108: "Play It Again, Brian" (2008)
 #121: "Not All Dogs Go to Heaven" (2009)
 #147: "Partial Terms of Endearment" (2010) BBC Three
 #154: "Road to the North Pole" (2010) (with Chris Sheridan)
 #177: "Livin' on a Prayer" (2012)
 #194: "Lois Comes Out of Her Shell" (2012)
 #229: "Meg Stinks!" (2014)
 #251: "Papa Has a Rollin' Son" (2015)
 #269: "Road to India" (2016)
 #286: "Peter's Lost Youth" (2017)
 #298: "Don't Be a Dickens at Christmas" (2017)
 #349: "Movin' In (Principal Shepherd's Song)" (2020)

References

External links

Living people
American television writers
American male television writers
American male voice actors
Writers from Rhode Island
1959 births
Screenwriters from Rhode Island
People from Smithfield, Rhode Island